The 2022–23 Swiss Promotion League (known as the YAPEAL Promotion League for sponsorship reasons) is the 11th season (9th under its current name) of the 3rd tier of the Swiss football league system under its current format.

Overview

Starting from this season, eighteen teams will play in a round-robin league with home and away games. The sixteen teams of the previous season are joined by FC Baden and FC Bulle, who were promoted from the 1. Liga Classic, and SC Kriens, who were relegated from the Challenge League, replaced last season's champion AC Bellinzona. Furthermore, the number of under-21 teams allowed in the Promotion League is no longer restricted to four, starting with this season. This season features five U21 teams. 

Due to an increase of teams in the Super League in the 2023–24 season, two teams are directly promoted to the Swiss Challenge League at the end of the season, subject to license validity. The third placed team will play a promotion play-off against the last place of the Challenge League. 

Classification also acts as qualifier for the Swiss Cup. The seven highest ranked (eligible) teams directly qualify to the first round of the 2023–24 Swiss Cup. U21 teams are not eligible for the Swiss Cup.

The season started on 6 August 2022 and the final matchday will be held on 27 May 2023. The promotion play-off takes place in during the following week. The league will be on winter break between 27 November 2022 and 18 February 2023 (between matchdays 18 and 19).

Teams

League table

Results

Promotion play-off

References

External links 
 
 1. Liga Promotion tables & results at soccerway.com

3
Switzerland
Switzerland, 3